Ravi Inder Singh Mehra (born 4 November 1987) is an Indian cricketer. He plays for Punjab in the Indian domestic cricket. He is a left-hand batsman and part-time offbreak bowler.

He married Pooja Verma on June 26, 2020.

In 2018 he signed for Pokhara Premier League in Nepal, where he gained popularity.

Currently he plays for Bhairahawa Gladiators in the Everest Premier League. He scored 124* in 53 balls in his EPL debut. He signed with the DC Hawks in Minor League Cricket.

References

External links

1987 births
Living people
Indian cricketers
Punjab, India cricketers
India Green cricketers
India Blue cricketers
North Zone cricketers
Cricketers from Patiala